The MacTutor History of Mathematics archive is a website maintained by John J. O'Connor and Edmund F. Robertson and hosted by the University of St Andrews in Scotland. It contains detailed biographies on many historical and contemporary mathematicians, as well as information on famous curves and various topics in the history of mathematics.

The History of Mathematics archive was an outgrowth of Mathematical MacTutor system, a HyperCard database by the same authors, which won them the European Academic Software award in 1994. In the same year, they founded their web site.  it has biographies on over 2800 mathematicians and scientists.

In 2015, O'Connor and Robertson won the Hirst Prize of the London Mathematical Society for their work. The citation for the Hirst Prize calls the archive "the most widely used and influential web-based resource in history of mathematics".

See also 
 Mathematics Genealogy Project
 MathWorld
 PlanetMath

References

External links
 
 Mathematical MacTutor system

Works about the history of mathematics
Mathematics websites
University of St Andrews